Wentworth Club is a privately owned golf club and country club in Virginia Water, Surrey, on the south western fringes of London, not far from Windsor Castle. The club was founded in 1922. Beijing-based Reignwood Group bought the club in September 2014 and implemented a new debenture membership structure, starting at £100,000. The debenture is now estimated at £175,000.

History
The 19th-century house the "Wentworths" (now the club house for the club) was the home for the brother-in-law of the Duke of Wellington. It was purchased in 1850 by exiled the Spanish Carlist captain-general Ramón Cabrera, 1st Count of Morella (Carlist title) and 1st Marquis of Têr (Bourbon title) and his heiress wife.  After his death, his widow, née Catherine Anne Vaughn-Richards, bought up the surrounding lands under The Cabrera Trust to safeguard the meadows, brooks and the trees planted from her travels on the continent with her gentrified husband to form what has become the heart of the Wentworth Estate.

In 1912, builder W. G. Tarrant had started developing St George's Hill, Weybridge – a development of houses based on minimum  plots based around a golf course. In 1922 Tarrant acquired the development rights for the Wentworth Estate, getting Harry Colt to develop a golf course around "Wentworth" house. Tarrant developed the large houses on the estate to a similar Surrey formula used at St George's Hill. Development of Wentworth Estate ground to a halt due to the Great Depression in the late 1920s. In 1931 when the banks asked for repayment of a large debenture, Tarrant was forced to declare bankruptcy. The ownership of the land passed to Wentworth Estates Ltd, which came under the control of Sir Lindsay Parkinson & Co Ltd.

In 1988, Elliott Bernerd's property investment company Chelsfield bought Wentworth Golf Club for £17.7 million (also reported as £20 million). Bernerd sold 40% of the club to Japanese investors, raising £32 million, in 1989. In 2004, Chelsfield sold the remaining 60% share, as fashion industry entrepreneur Richard Caring bought the club for £130 million. In 2014 Caring sold the club for £135m to Beijing-based Reignwood Investments (a holding company associated with billionaire Yan Bin), which has made the club more exclusive by cutting the number of members and raising the fees. Current debentures cost £175,000 and the annual fees is £16,000.

Today
Wentworth Club is best known for its associations with professional golf. It has three eighteen-hole courses: the famous Harry Colt-designed West Course from 1926, the earlier yet lesser-played East Course which was also designed by Colt in 1924, the recent Edinburgh Course designed by John Jacobs, and a nine-hole par-3 executive course.

The headquarters of the PGA European Tour are located at the club, and each year it hosts the Tour's PGA Championship. It was the venue of the 1953 Ryder Cup and of the World Match Play Championship from 1964 until 2007.

The club is surrounded by and entwined with the Wentworth Estate, one of the most expensive private estates in the London suburbs, which was built at the same time, where many top golfers and other celebrities have homes. One of them is Ernie Els, who became the club's "world-wide touring professional" in 2005.

Wentworth also has a tennis and health club.  The Wentworth Tennis and Health Club consists of a gymnasium, dance studio, health spa, ozone swimming pool and Jacuzzi, crèche facilities, changing rooms, and a café.  The extensive facility was completed in 1999 for £9 million by architects Broadway Malyan.

Golf courses

West Course
Opened: 1926
Architect: Harry Colt (redesigned from 2005 to 2017 by Ernie Els)
Par: 72
Length: 
Course Record: 62, Robert Karlsson, Thomas Bjørn, Alex Norén
Key tournaments: HSBC World Match Play Championship, 1964 – 2007: BMW PGA Championship, 1984 – present: Ryder Cup, 1953: World Cup 1956

West Course Scorecard

East Course
Opened: 1924
Architect: Harry Colt
Par: 68
Length: 
Course Record: 62, Doug N Sewell
Key tournaments: inaugural Curtis Cup, 1932; friendly match between US and GB&I (forerunner to Ryder Cup) 1926.
East Course Scorecard

Edinburgh Course
Opened: 1990
Architect: John Jacobs (with Gary Player and Bernard Gallacher)
Par: 72
Length: 
Course Record: 67, Gary Orr
Tournaments held: Wentworth Senior Masters
Edinburgh Course Scorecard

Executive Course (9 Holes)
Par: 27
Length:

References

External links

Golf clubs and courses in Surrey
Golf clubs and courses designed by Harry Colt
Ryder Cup venues
Curtis Cup venues